Pardon My Stripes is a 1942 American comedy film directed by John H. Auer and written by Lawrence Kimble and Stuart Palmer. The film stars William "Bill" Henry, Sheila Ryan, Edgar Kennedy, Harold Huber, Paul Hurst and Cliff Nazarro. The film was released on January 26, 1942, by Republic Pictures.

Plot

Cast 
William "Bill" Henry as Henry Platt 
Sheila Ryan as Ruth Stevens
Edgar Kennedy as Warden Bingham
Harold Huber as Big George Kilraine
Paul Hurst as Feets
Cliff Nazarro as Nutsy
Tom Kennedy as Casino
Edwin Stanley as Andrews
Dorothy Granger as Peaches
George McKay as Old Timer
Maxine Leslie as Myrtle

References

External links
 

1942 films
1940s English-language films
American comedy films
1942 comedy films
Republic Pictures films
Films directed by John H. Auer
American black-and-white films
1940s American films